Carthage is a commune in Tunis Governorate, Tunisia. 
It is named for, and includes in its area, the archaeological site of Carthage.

Established in 1919, Carthage is some 15 km to the east-northeast of Tunis,  situated between the towns of Sidi Bou Said to the north and Le Kram to the south. It is reached from Tunis by the R23 road via La Goulette, or by the N9 road via Tunis-Carthage Airport.

The population as of January 2013 was estimated at 21,277, 
mostly attracting the more wealthy residents. 
The Carthage Palace (the Tunisian presidential palace) is located on the coast.

Carthage has six train stations of the TGM line between Le Kram and Sidi Bou Said: 
Carthage Salammbo (named for  the ancient children’s cemetery where it stands), Carthage Byrsa (named for Byrsa hill), Carthage Dermech (Dermèche), Carthage Hannibal (named for Hannibal), Carthage Présidence (named for the Presidential Palace) and Carthage Amilcar (named for Hamilcar).

History

Roman Carthage was destroyed following the Muslim invasion of 698, and it remained undeveloped for more than a thousand years (being replaced in the function of regional capital by the Medina of Tunis under Arab and later Ottoman rule), until the establishment of the French protectorate of Tunisia in 1881.

The cathedral of St. Louis of Carthage was built  on Byrsa hill  in 1884.
In 1885, Pope Leo XIII acknowledged the revived Archdiocese of Carthage as the primatial see of Africa and Charles Lavigerie as primate. European-style villas were built along the beach beginning in 1906; one such villa was chosen by Habib Bourguiba as the presidential palace in 1960.

The municipality was created by a decree of the Bey of Tunis on 15 June 1919, during the rule of Naceur Bey.

Construction on the Tunis-Carthage Airport, which was fully funded by France, began in 1944, and in 1948 the airport become the main hub for Tunisair. 
In the 1950s the Lycée Français de Carthage was established to serve French families in Carthage. In 1961 it was given to the Tunisian government as part of the Independence of Tunisia, so the nearby Collège Maurice Cailloux in La Marsa, previously an annex of the Lycée Français de Carthage, was renamed to the Lycée Français de La Marsa and began serving the lycée level. It is currently the Lycée Gustave Flaubert.

After Tunisian independence in 1956, the Tunis conurbation gradually extended around the airport, and Carthage is now a suburb of Tunis.

In February 1985, Ugo Vetere, the mayor of Rome, and Chedly Klibi, the mayor of Carthage, signed a symbolic treaty "officially" ending the conflict between their cities, which had been supposedly extended by the lack of a peace treaty for more than 2,100 years.

The office of mayor was held by Chedli Klibi from 1963 to 1990, by 
Fouad Mebazaa from 1995 to 1998 and by Sami Tarzi from 2003 to 2011, and by 
Azedine Beschaouch from 2011.
The monumental Malik ibn Anas mosque
(also El Abidine  mosque), built on an area of three hectares on Odéon hill, was inaugurated in 2003.

See also

Ancient Carthage
Carthage (archaeological site)
History of Carthage

References

External links 

 
Communes of Tunisia
Carthage
Populated places in Tunis Governorate
Populated places established in 1919
1919 establishments in Tunisia
Articles with hCards and Geo